The National Convention Party (NCP) is a political party in Ghana that existed between 1992 and January 1996.

Formation and Progressive Alliance
The party was formed in 1992 after the ban on political parties was lifted by the military Provisional National Defence Council (PNDC) government. Its first leader was Kow Nkensen Arkaah. Kojo Tsikata is reported to have been instrumental in getting the Kwame Nkrumah Youngsters Club and the Kwame Nkrumah Welfare Society to merge to form the National Convention Party. He was the patron of both clubs. He was also instrumental along with P. V. Obeng and Ebo Tawiah in forming the electoral alliance between the NCP and the National Democratic Congress (NDC).

Electoral performance

1992 elections
The NCP contested the 1992 presidential election in an alliance with the National Democratic Congress (NDC) led by Jerry Rawlings and Every Ghanaian Living Everywhere (EGLE) led by Owuraku Amofa. The alliance put forward a single candidate for president, Jerry Rawlings and a single vice president candidate, Ekow Arkaah on November 3, 1992. They won 58.4% of the popular vote and became the first President and Vice President of the Fourth Republic of Ghana.

In the 29 December 1992 Parliamentary election, the NCP won 8 out of 200 constituencies, becoming the second largest party in parliament.

Parliamentary elections

Presidential elections

Merger
The "Nkrumahist" parties decided to merge before contesting the 1996 elections. The People's Convention Party (PCP) and the NCP then announced the formation of the Convention People's Party on 29 January 1996. This signaled the end of the NCP as a standalone party.

Notes

Defunct political parties in Ghana
1992 in Ghana
Political parties established in 1992
Political parties disestablished in 1996